V. Gowthaman (Tamil: வ. கவுதமன்) is a Tamil film director, actor and politician who works in Tamil cinema. He has directed Magizhchi,Kanave Kalaiyadhe and several television soap opera including the famous thriller biographical drama of Auto Shankar and Veerappan in the name of Auto Sankar and Santhanakkaadu respectively which was aired in Makkal TV. His current directorial venture is Maaveera, a new film loosely based on one of the prominent leaders of PMK, Kaduvetti Guru. He has been very vocal about sociopolitical issues who is known for his participation in the Jallikattu protests and the Eelam Tamil genocide by Srilanka. He is also the founder and leader of Tamil Perarasu Katchi which was founded in early 2019. He unsuccessfully contested in 2019 by-election in the Vikravandi Assembly Constituency and 2021 Legislation Assembly elections in the Kunnam Assembly Constituency of Ariyalur District.

Career
Gowthaman made his directorial debut with Kanave Kalaiyadhe (1998) starring Murali and Simran. In 2001, he started a film titled Poranthaalum Pompalaiyaa Porakkakkoodaathu with Livingston and Pandiarajan in the lead, though the film was later dropped.

After a long gap he directed a tele series for Makkal TV based on the life of serial killer Auto Shankar and "Santhanakaadu" based on Veerappan. He made his comeback as a director with Magizhchi (2010) in which he also made his debut as an actor. Gowthaman was working with the screenplay of the movie for 12 years. The film, received good reviews for its content and went unnoticed due to its low key release.

He went on to direct a short film called "Vetti" which received critical acclaim and rave reviews from public. The short film stirred controversy as the police felt that it was insulting against national flag.

Filmography

Director
Films
Kanave Kalaiyadhe (1998)
Magizhchi (2010)

Television
Santhanakadu
Auto Shankar

Actor
Neengalum Herothan (1990) - Tiger' Premnath's fan
Kaadhale Nimmadhi (1998) - Servant
Magizhchi (2010)

Politics and activism 
Gowthaman have organized and participated many protest favoring Tamil people interests. He has been part of Jallikattu protest, Cauvery water dispute, farmer related issues, katchatheevu reinstatement and other issues.

He floated a new party Tamil Perarasu Katchi and contested in 2019 by-election held in Vikravandi constituency in Tamil Nadu.

References 

Living people
Tamil film directors
20th-century Indian film directors
Male actors in Tamil cinema
Year of birth missing (living people)